"Where Do I Go from Here" is a song written by Parker McGee and first recorded by soft rock duo England Dan & John Ford Coley in 1977 for their album Dowdy Ferry Road. The following year, Barry Manilow recorded his version which featured on his 1978 album Even Now. The song was also covered by The Carpenters on the posthumously released album Lovelines in 1989 as the second track.

References

1977 songs
England Dan & John Ford Coley songs
The Carpenters songs
Barry Manilow songs
Song recordings produced by Ron Dante
Songs written by Parker McGee